The Arabic-language journal al-Ādab wa-l-Fann (الادب وا لفن; DMG: al-Ādāb wa-l-Fann; "Literature and Art“) was published in London from 1943 to 1945. The editor was the British publishing house Hodder & Stoughton which was founded in 1868 and still exists.

The magazine addressed an Arabic-speaking readership aiming to inform them extensively about literary and artistic topics of that time. However, the main purpose of the journal was not only to inform about contemporary British and Arabic literature and art but to encourage the readers to exchange views through readers letters. In the section "Literary Exchange" selected British and Arabic prose were published with the request to submit adequate Arabic or English translations, which then also were printed.

In addition to portraits of contemporary well-known British writers, such as John Masefield and Walter Whitman, selected papers, poems and excerpts from well-known international writers of that time were publicized. Numerous articles on cultural and scientific achievements and institutions such as the typewriter, the British railways, well-known libraries and universities of England found place as well as texts on contemporary music, art and philosophy.

The magazine was also funded by numerous advertisements of British products and brands which were generously distributed in each issue.

References

External links
 

1943 establishments in the United Kingdom
1946 disestablishments in the United Kingdom
Arabic-language magazines
Cultural magazines published in the United Kingdom
Defunct literary magazines published in the United Kingdom
Magazines established in 1943
Magazines disestablished in 1946
Magazines published in London
Visual arts magazines published in the United Kingdom